John Horgan (1876 – 27 June 1955) was an Irish politician from Cork who had a very brief career as a parliamentary representative in the Irish Free State. He served for three months as a Teachta Dála (TD) for the National League Party, a short-lived party which advocated closer ties with the United Kingdom. He was a member of the Cork Corporation, served a term as Lord Mayor of Cork.

He was born in Limerick, the son of a County Cork ironmonger, and master plumber.

He was elected at the June 1927 general election as a TD for the Cork Borough constituency, taking his seat as one of eight National League TDs in the 5th Dáil. However, the 5th Dáil was short-lived, and at the September 1927 general election Horgan and all but two of his party's TDs lost their seats. The party went bankrupt in 1928, and was formally disbanded in 1931.

Horgan subsequently joined Cumann na nGaedheal, and stood again as a Cumann na nGaedheal candidate in Cork Borough at the 1932 and 1933 general elections, but did not regain his seat.

As a member of Fine Gael, Horgan was Lord Mayor of Cork for the term from 1941 to 1942. He retired from Cork Corporation in 1949 after 25 years' membership.

He died at his residence, at 2, The Orchards, Glasheen Road, Cork, on 27 June 1955 aged 79. and is buried at St. Finbarr's Cemetery. His grandson, Seán O'Leary, served as Lord Mayor of Cork from 1972 to 1973.

References

 

1876 births
1955 deaths
Fine Gael politicians
Local councillors in Cork (city)
Lord Mayors of Cork
National League Party TDs
Members of the 5th Dáil
People from Cork (city)
Cumann na nGaedheal politicians